The 2012 Slovenian Supercup was the eight edition of the Slovenian Supercup, an annual football match contested by the winners of the previous season's Slovenian PrvaLiga and Slovenian Cup competitions. The match was played on 8 July 2012, in Ljudski vrt stadium between 2011–12 Slovenian PrvaLiga runners-up Olimpija Ljubljana and 2011–12 Slovenian PrvaLiga winners Maribor, as Maribor won both the Slovenian Cup and the Slovenian PrvaLiga in the previous season.

Match details

See also
2011–12 Slovenian PrvaLiga
2011–12 Slovenian Football Cup
2012–13 NK Maribor season

External links
Slovenian Supercup

Slovenian Supercup
Supercup
Slovenian Supercup 2012